Cymatochiton is an extinct genus of polyplacophoran molluscs. Cymatochiton became extinct during the Permian period.

Species:
Chiton loftusianus (King, 1848) = Cymatochiton loftusianus (King, 1848)
Rhynchoteuthis kaibabensis (Brady, 1955) = 6Cymatochiton kaibabensis (Brady, 1955)

References 

Carboniferous molluscs
Prehistoric chiton genera
Permian molluscs
Carboniferous animals of North America
Carboniferous animals of Europe
Carboniferous first appearances
Permian genus extinctions